Invercargill Central is the central business district and central suburb of Invercargill, in the Southland region of the South Island of New Zealand.

It has a population of 1,365 as of 2018.  Invercargill central is the only area in Southland to contain commercial high rise buildings which are the furthest south tall buildings in the world

Demographics

Invercargill Central had a population of 1,365 at the 2018 New Zealand census, an increase of 240 people (21.3%) since the 2013 census, and an increase of 210 people (18.2%) since the 2006 census. There were 462 households. There were 777 males and 591 females, giving a sex ratio of 1.31 males per female. The median age was 34.6 years (compared with 37.4 years nationally), with 126 people (9.2%) aged under 15 years, 420 (30.8%) aged 15 to 29, 627 (45.9%) aged 30 to 64, and 195 (14.3%) aged 65 or older.

Ethnicities were 60.9% European/Pākehā, 14.7% Māori, 2.6% Pacific peoples, 27.5% Asian, and 4.4% other ethnicities (totals add to more than 100% since people could identify with multiple ethnicities).

The proportion of people born overseas was 36.0%, compared with 27.1% nationally.

Although some people objected to giving their religion, 41.3% had no religion, 36.7% were Christian, 5.3% were Hindu, 2.9% were Muslim, 2.4% were Buddhist and 4.4% had other religions.

Of those at least 15 years old, 285 (23.0%) people had a bachelor or higher degree, and 231 (18.6%) people had no formal qualifications. The median income was $16,500, compared with $31,800 nationally. 84 people (6.8%) earned over $70,000 compared to 17.2% nationally. The employment status of those at least 15 was that 396 (32.0%) people were employed full-time, 216 (17.4%) were part-time, and 114 (9.2%) were unemployed.

Education
Invercargill Middle School is a state contributing primary school for years 1 to 6 with a roll of  students as of  The school opened in 1873 as Invercargill Grammar School, became Invercargill District High School and then Invercargill Central School, and adopted the current name in 1885.

St Joseph's School is a state-integrated Catholic school for year 1 to 8 with a roll of  students. The school has a continuous history from 1882 and traces its origins to the late 1860s.

The Southern Institute of Technology's three Invercargill campuses are located in Invercargill Central.

References

Suburbs of Invercargill
Central business districts in New Zealand